This article serves as an index – as complete as possible – of all the honorific orders or similar decorations awarded by Estonia, classified by Monarchies chapter and Republics chapter, and, under each chapter, recipients' countries and the detailed list of recipients.

Awards

President Lennart Meri (1992-2001): Collar of the Order of the Cross of Terra Mariana (10.09.1995, serie 5 - n° ?)

 President Arnold Rüütel (2001–2006): Collar of the Order of the Cross of Terra Mariana (08.10.2001, serie 270 - n° 1138)

 President Toomas Hendrik Ilves (2006-2016): Collar of the Order of the Cross of Terra Mariana (09.10.2006, serie 692 - n° 1071)

 President Kersti Kaljulaid (2016 incumbent): Collar of the Order of the Cross of Terra Mariana (10.10.2016)

MONARCHIES 
European monarchies

British Royal Family 

Queen Elizabeth II: Collar of the Order of the Cross of Terra Mariana (19.10.2006, serie 693 - n° 2)

Norwegian Royal Family 
See also decorations pages (mark °): Harald, Sonja, Haakon, Mette-Marit, Mârtha Louise, Astrid & Ragnhild

 Harald V of Norway: Collar of the Order of the Cross of Terra Mariana ° (31.08.1998, serie 75 - n° 397) 
 Queen Sonja of Norway: Recipient First Class of the Order of the Cross of Terra Mariana° (24.08.1998) 
 Haakon, Crown Prince of Norway: Recipient First Class of the Order of the Cross of Terra Mariana ° (02.04.2002) 
 Mette-Marit, Crown Princess of Norway: Recipient First Class  of the Order of the Cross of Terra Mariana° (02.04.2002)

Swedish Royal Family   

They have been awarded :

 Carl XVI Gustaf of Sweden :
 Collar of the Order of the Cross of Terra Mariana (11/09/1995, serie 11 - n° 608)  - Collar of the Order of the White Star (18/01/2011)
 Queen Silvia of Sweden :
 Recipient First Class of the Order of the Cross of Terra Mariana(11/09/1995)  - Recipient First Class  of the Order of the White Star (18/01/2011)
 Victoria, Crown Princess of Sweden :
 Recipient First Class  of the Order of the Cross of Terra Mariana (11/09/1995)  - Recipient First Class of the Order of the White Star (18/01/2011) 
 Prince Daniel, Duke of Västergötland: Recipient First Class of the Order of the Cross of Terra Mariana (18/01/2011)
 Prince Carl Philip, Duke of Värmland: Recipient First Class of the Order of the Cross of Terra Mariana (18/01/2011)

Danish Royal Family 
See also decorations pages (click on "Decorations"):  Margrethe - Henrik - Frederik - Mary - Joachim - Marie - Benedikte

 Margrethe II of Denmark: Collar of the Order of the Cross of Terra Mariana (28/11/1995, serie 23 - n° 640) 
 Frederik, Crown Prince of Denmark: Recipient First Class of the Order of the Cross of Terra Mariana (28/11/1995)

Dutch Royal Family 

 King Willem-Alexander of the Netherlands: Collar of the Order of the Cross of Terra Mariana (05.06.2018, serie 1283  - n° 265) 
Queen Máxima of the Netherlands : Recipient First Class of the Order of the Cross of Terra Mariana (05.06.2018, serie 1284  - n° 265)
 Princess Beatrix of the Netherlands: Collar of the Order of the Cross of Terra Mariana (14.05.2008, serie 824 - n° 280)

Belgian Royal Family 
 King Albert II: Collar of the Order of the Cross of Terra Mariana (10.06.2008, serie 837 - n° 290) 
 Queen Paola: Recipient First Class of the Order of the Cross of Terra Mariana (2008)

Luxembourgish Grand-Ducal Family 

 Henri, Grand Duke of Luxembourg: Collar of the Order of the Cross of Terra Mariana (05.05.2003, serie 416 - n° 332)

Spanish Royal Family 

 Felipe VI of Spain: Recipient First Class of the Order of the Cross of Terra Mariana (July 2007) 
 Queen Letizia of Spain: Recipient First Class of the Order of the Cross of Terra Mariana (July 2007) 
 Juan Carlos I of Spain: Collar of the Order of the Cross of Terra Mariana (09.07.2007 serie 741 - n° 168)
 Queen Sofía of Spain: Recipient First Class of the Order of the Cross of Terra Mariana

Asian monarchies

Japanese Imperial Family 

 Emperor Akihito: Collar of the Order of the Cross of Terra Mariana (24/05/2007, serie 740 - n° 150)

REPUBLICS 
The recipients are :

 Republics of Europe

President Georgi Parvanov (2002-2012): Collar of the Order of the Cross of Terra Mariana (11.06.2003, serie n° 435 - decision n° 414)
 Zorka Petrova Parvanova, his wife: Recipient First Class of the Order of the Cross of Terra Mariana (11.06.2003, serie n° 436 - decision n° 414)

President Tassos Papadopoulos (2003–2008): Collar of the Order of the Cross of Terra Mariana (08.01.2004, serie n° 449 - decision n° 451)

President Václav Havel (1993–2003): Collar of the Order of the Cross of Terra Mariana (24.02.1997, serie n° 37 - decision n° 725)

President Mauno Henrik Koivisto (1982–1994): Recipient First Class of the Order of the Cross of Terra Mariana (20.11.2001, serie n° 271 - decision n° 30)
 Tellervo Koivisto, his wife: Recipient First Class of the Order of the Cross of Terra Mariana (20.11.2001, serie n° 272 - decision n° 30)
 President Martti Ahtisaari (1994–2000): Collar of the Order of the Cross of Terra Mariana (16.05.1995, serie n° 1 - decision n° 547)
 Eeva Hyvärinen, his wife: Recipient First Class of the Order of the Cross of Terra Mariana (16.05.1995, serie n° 2 - decision n° 547)
 President Tarja Halonen (2000–2012) :
 Collar of the Order of the Cross of Terra Mariana (16.05.2000, serie n° 123 - decision n° 788)
 Collar of the Order of the White Star (14.03.2007, serie n° 2572 - decision n° 137)
 Pentti Arajärvi, her husband :
 Recipient First Class of the Order of the Cross of Terra Mariana (16.05.2000, serie n° 124 - decision n° 788)
 Recipient First Class of the Order of the White Star (14.03.2007, serie n° 2573 - decision n° 137)
 President Sauli Niinistö (2012–): Collar of the Order of the Cross of Terra Mariana (09.05.2014, serie n° 1150 - decision n° 429)
 Jenni Haukio, his wife: Recipient First Class of the Order of the Cross of Terra Mariana (09.05.2014, serie n° 1151 - decision n° 429)

President Jacques Chirac (1995-2007): Collar of the Order of the Cross of Terra Mariana (23.07.2001, serie n° 243 - decision n° 1124)

President Mikheil Saakashvili (2004-2007/2008-2013): Collar of the Order of the Cross of Terra Mariana (07.05.2007, serie n° 739 - decision n° 148)

President Roman Herzog (1994–1999): Recipient First Class of the Order of the Cross of Terra Mariana  (20.03.2001, serie n° 104 - decision n° 730)
 President Johannes Rau (1999-2004): Collar of the Order of the Cross of Terra Mariana (07.11.2000, serie n° 131 - decision n° 914)
 Christina Rau, his wife: Recipient First Class of the Order of the Cross of Terra Mariana (07.11.2000, serie n° 132 - decision n° 914)
 President Joachim Gauck (2012-2017): Collar of the Order of the Cross of Terra Mariana (03.07.2013, serie n° 1087 - decision n° 305)
 Daniela Schadt, his partner: Recipient First Class of the Order of the Cross of Terra Mariana  (09.07.2013, serie n° 1088 - decision n° 305)

President Konstantinos Stephanopoulos (1995–2005): Collar of the Order of the Cross of Terra Mariana (24.05.1999, serie n° 99 - decision n° 586)

President Árpád Göncz (1990–2000): Collar of the Order of the Cross of Terra Mariana (13.05.1997, serie n° 49 - decision n° 134)

 President Ferenc Mádl (2000–2005) :
 Collar of the Order of the Cross of Terra Mariana (12.12.2000, serie n° 177 - decision n° 944)
 Collar of the Order of the White Star (11.09.2002, serie n° 1247 - decision n° 227)
 Dalma Némethy, his wife :
 Recipient First Class of the Order of the Cross of Terra Mariana (12.12.2000, serie n° 178 - decision n° 944)
 Recipient First Class of the Order of the White Star (11.09.2002, serie n° 1248 - decision n° 227)
 President László Sólyom (2005–2010) :
 Collar of the Order of the Cross of Terra Mariana (27.03.2006, serie n° 688 - decision n° 994)
 Collar of the Order of the White Star (05.10.2009, serie n° 2747 - decision n° 528)

President Ólafur Ragnar Grímsson (1996-2016) :
 Collar of the Order of the Cross of Terra Mariana (08.06.1998, serie n° 73 - decision n° 351)
 Collar of the Order of the White Star (04.05.2004, serie n° 1662 - decision n° 622)

President Mary McAleese (1997–2011): Collar of the Order of the Cross of Terra Mariana (24.05.2001, serie n° 241 - decision n° 1057)
 Martin McAleese, her husband: Recipient First Class of the Order of the Cross of Terra Mariana (24.05.2001, serie n° 242 - decision n° 1057)

President Oscar Luigi Scalfaro (1992–1999): Collar of the Order of the Cross of Terra Mariana (22.05.1997, serie n° 51 - decision n° 144)
 President Carlo Azeglio Ciampi (1999–2006): Collar of the Order of the Cross of Terra Mariana (20.04.2004, serie n° 498 - decision n° 581)
 President Sergio Mattarella (2015-incumbent): Collar of the Order of the Cross of Terra Mariana (02.07.2018, serie n°1298 - decision n° 294
 Laura Mattarella, his daughter (serving as First Lady): Recipient First Class Order of the Cross of Terra Mariana (02.07.2018, serie n°1299 - decision n° 294)

President Guntis Ulmanis (1993–1999) :Collar of the Order of the Cross of Terra Mariana (23.10.1996, serie n° 39 - decision n° 6)

 President Vaira Vīķe-Freiberga (1999-2007) :
 Collar of the Order of the Cross of Terra Mariana (02.05.2000, serie n° 121 - decision n° 780)
 Collar of the Order of the White Star (07.12.2005, serie n° 1914 - decision n° 937)
 Imants Freibergs, her husband :
 Recipient First Class of the Order of the Cross of Terra Mariana (02.05.2000, serie n° 122 - decision n° 780)
 Recipient First Class of the Order of the White Star (07.12.2005, serie n° 1915 - decision n° 937)
 President Valdis Zatlers (2007–2011): Collar of the Order of the Cross of Terra Mariana (07.04.2009, serie n° 872 - decision n° 460)
 Lilita Zatlere, his wife: Recipient First Class of the Order of the Cross of Terra Mariana (07.04.2009, serie n° 873 - decision n° 460)
 President Andris Bērziņš (2011-2015): Collar of the Order of the Cross of Terra Mariana (05.06.2012, serie n° 1001 - decision n° 99)
 Dace Seisuma, his wife: Recipient First Class of the Order of the Cross of Terra Mariana  (05.06.2012, serie n° 1002 - decision n° 99)
 President Raimonds Vējonis (2015 incumbent): Collar of the Order of the Cross of Terra Mariana (02.04.2019, serie n° 1324 - decision n° 440)
 Iveta Vējone, his wife: Recipient First Class of the Order of the Cross of Terra Mariana  (02.04.2019, serie n° 1325 - decision n° 440)

President Algirdas Brazauskas (1993–1998): * Collar of the Order of the Cross of Terra Mariana (20.08.1997, serie n° 55 - decision n° 177)

 President Valdas Adamkus (1998–2003, 2004–2009) :
 Collar of the Order of the Cross of Terra Mariana (24.09.1999, serie n° 102 - decision n° 632)
 Collar of the Order of the White Star (04.10.2004, serie n° 1663 - decision n° 693)
 Alma Adamkienė, his wife :
 President Dalia Grybauskaitė (2009-incumbent): Collar of the Order of the Cross of Terra Mariana (27.05.2013, serie n° 1045 - decision n° 266)

President Guido de Marco (1999–2004) :
 Collar of the Order of the Cross of Terra Mariana (02.05.2001, serie n° 233 - decision n° 1049)
 Collar of the Order of the White Star (01.10.2003, serie n° 1414 - decision n° 445)
 Violet de Marco, his wife :
 Recipient First Class of the Order of the Cross of Terra Mariana (02.05.2001, serie n° 234 - decision n° 1049)
 Recipient First Class of the Order of the White Star (01.10.2003, serie n° 1415 - decision n° 445)
 President Eddie Fenech Adami (2004–2009), when Prime Minister: Recipient First Class of the Order of the Cross of Terra Mariana (01.10.2003, serie n° 440 - decision n° 445)
 President George Abela (2009-2014): Collar of the Order of the Cross of Terra Mariana (31.05.2012, serie n° 988 - decision n° 98)
 Margaret Abela, his wife : Recipient First Class of the Order of the Cross of Terra Mariana (31.05.2012, serie n° 989  - decision n° 98)

President Lech Wałęsa (1990–1995): Recipient First Class of the Order of the Cross of Terra Mariana (23.02.2006, serie n° 636 - n°976)

 President Aleksander Kwaśniewski (1995-2005) :
 Collar of the Order of the Cross of Terra Mariana (28.04.1998, serie n° 72 - decision n° 320)
 Collar of the Order of the White Star (18.03.2002, serie n° 1193 - decision n° 121)
 Jolanta Kwaśniewska, his wife: Recipient First Class of the Order of the Cross of Terra Mariana (18.03.2002, serie n° 337 - n°121)

President Jorge Sampaio (1996–2006) :
 Collar of the Order of the Cross of Terra Mariana (12.05.2003, serie n° 417 - decision n° 408)
 Collar of the Order of the White Star (28.11.2005, serie n° 1892 - decision n° 936)
 Maria José Rodrigues Ritta, his wife :
 Recipient First Class of the Order of the Cross of Terra Mariana (12.05.2003, serie n° 418 - decision n° 408)
 Recipient First Class of the Order of the White Star (28.11.2005, serie n° 1893 - decision n° 936)
 President Aníbal Cavaco Silva (2006-2016): Collar of the Order of the Cross of Terra Mariana (24.09.2008, serie n° 783 - decision n° 269)

 President Marcelo Rebelo de Sousa (2016 incumbent): Collar of the Order of the Cross of Terra Mariana (10.04.2019, serie n° 1339 - decision n° 442)

President Ion Iliescu (1989–96, 2000–04): Collar of the Order of the Cross of Terra Mariana (23.10.2003, serie n° 446 - decision n° 451)

 President Traian Băsescu (2004-2014): Collar of the Order of the Cross of Terra Mariana (12.04.2011, serie n° 968 - decision n° 881)
 Maria Băsescu, his wife: Recipient First Class of the Order of the Cross of Terra Mariana (12.04.2011, serie n° 969  - decision n° 881)

President Ivan Gašparovič (2004-2014): Collar of the Order of the Cross of Terra Mariana (12.10.2005, serie n° 599 - decision n° 896)

President Milan Kučan (1991-2002): Collar of the Order of the Cross of Terra Mariana (16.05.1997, serie n° 50 - decision n° 134)

 Republics of the Middle East

President Süleyman Demirel (1993–2000): Collar of the Order of the Cross of Terra Mariana (20.05.1997, serie n° 52 - decision n° 144)
 President Ahmet Necdet Sezer (2000–07): Collar of the Order of the Cross of Terra Mariana (18.04.2002, serie n° 377 - decision n° 141)

 Republics of the Far East

President Nursultan Nazarbayev (1990-2019): Collar of the Order of the Cross of Terra Mariana (20.04.2011, serie n° 970 - decision n° 885)

 Republics of America

President Ernesto Zedillo (1994-2000): Collar of the Order of the Cross of Terra Mariana (27.10.1995, serie n° 22 - decision n° 624)

President Gerald Ford (1974–1977): Recipient First Class of the Order of the Cross of Terra Mariana (07.01.1997, serie n° 29 - decision n° 683)
 President George H. W. Bush (1989-1993): Recipient First Class of the Order of the Cross of Terra Mariana (15.09.2005, serie n° 524 - decision n° 775)
 President Bill Clinton (1993-2001): Recipient First Class of the Order of the Cross of Terra Mariana (06.02.2006, serie n° 634 - decision n° 976)
 Hillary Clinton, his wife: Recipient First Class of the Order of the Cross of Terra Mariana (06.02.2013, serie n° 1035 - decision n° 224)
 President George W. Bush (2001–2009): Recipient First Class of the Order of the Cross of Terra Mariana (01.02.2012, serie n° 973 - decision n° 48)

References 

 
Estonia